The 1940 United States Senate election in Washington was held on November 5, 1940. Incumbent Democrat Lewis Schwellenbach did not run for a second term in office. He was succeeded by Democratic U.S. Representative Monrad C. Wallgren, who defeated Republican Stephen Foster Chadwick for the open seat.

Blanket primary

Candidates

Democratic
Frank T. Bell
Harry C. Huse
Donald B. Miller
Roy B. Misener
Robert Lee Smith
Monrad Wallgren, U.S. Representative from Everett

Republican
Stephen Fowler Chadwick
Ewing D. Colvin
Howard E. Foster
Eric Johnston
Robert Prior

Results

General election

Results

See also 
 1940 United States Senate elections

References

1940
Washington
United States Senate